Hydroxyprostaglandin dehydrogenase 15-(NAD) (the HUGO-approved symbol = HPGD; HGNC ID, HGNC:5154), also called 15-hydroxyprostaglandin dehydrogenase (NAD+),, is an enzyme that catalyzes the following chemical reaction:

(5Z,13E)-(15S)-11alpha,15-dihydroxy-9-oxoprost-13-enoate + NAD+  (5Z,13E)-11alpha-hydroxy-9,15-dioxoprost-13-enoate + NADH + H+

Thus, the two substrates of this enzyme are (5Z,13E)-(15S)-11alpha,15-dihydroxy-9-oxoprost-13-enoate and NAD+, whereas its 3 products are (5Z,13E)-11alpha-hydroxy-9,15-dioxoprost-13-enoate, NADH, and H+.

This enzyme belongs to the family of oxidoreductases, specifically those acting on the CH-OH group of donor with NAD+ or NADP+ as acceptor. The systematic name of this enzyme class is (5Z,13E)-(15S)-11alpha,15-dihydroxy-9-oxoprost-13-enoate:NAD+ 15-oxidoreductase. Other names in common use include NAD+-dependent 15-hydroxyprostaglandin dehydrogenase (type I), PGDH, 11alpha,15-dihydroxy-9-oxoprost-13-enoate:NAD+ 15-oxidoreductase, 15-OH-PGDH, 15-hydroxyprostaglandin dehydrogenase, 15-hydroxyprostanoic dehydrogenase, NAD+-specific 15-hydroxyprostaglandin dehydrogenase, prostaglandin dehydrogenase, and 15-hydroxyprostaglandin dehydrogenase (NAD+).

Structural studies

As of late 2007, only one structure has been solved for this class of enzymes, with the PDB accession code .

References

 
 
 
 

EC 1.1.1
NADH-dependent enzymes
Enzymes of known structure